The Museum of English Rural Life, also known as The MERL, is a museum, library and archive dedicated to recording the changing face of farming and the countryside in England. The museum is run by the University of Reading, and is situated in Redlands Road to the rear of the institution's London Road Campus near to the centre of Reading in southern England. The location was formerly known as East Thorpe House and then  St. Andrews Hall. It is an accredited museum and accredited archive as recognised by Arts Council England and the National Archives.

History
The museum's site was originally occupied by a house known as East Thorpe, designed in 1880 by Alfred Waterhouse for Alfred Palmer (of the Reading biscuit manufacturers Huntley & Palmers). Palmer was an important early benefactor of Reading University and in 1911 East Thorpe was extended to become St Andrews Hall, a hall of residence for women attending the university.

The museum itself was founded in 1951, growing out of the university's long academic connections with agriculture. The founding objects of the museum came from the collections of H. J. Massingham and Lavinia Smith. It originally occupied premises on the University of Reading's main Whiteknights Campus, opening to the public in 1955. St Andrews Hall closed as a hall of residence in 2001. The site was then redeveloped for the use of the museum, with the cost of £11m being shared by the university, the Heritage Lottery Fund and public donations. The redeveloped museum opened in 2005 and retains the original East Thorpe building, with the addition of an adjoining new building. The two contrasting buildings overlook restored gardens, providing a setting for a rural collection in an urban environment.

The Museum underwent a period of further redevelopment from 20132016, funded by the Heritage Lottery Fund, the Wellcome Trust, and the University of Reading. The Museum officially reopened on 22 October 2016 with ten new galleries, including a gallery dedicated to Ladybird Books artwork held by the University of Reading Special Collections.

In February 2019, a bat was found on the museum's premises. The museum named the bat MERLin and issued him a library card.

Collections
The Museum houses designated collections of national importance that span the full range of objects, archives, photographs, film and books. It is also the location of the University of Reading's special collections archive, housing hundreds of collections of rare books, manuscripts, typescripts and other objects of importance. The collections hold over 25,000 objects, almost all of which are on display, and which provide a material record of rural England covering 1750 to the present day. It cares for a collection of livestock portraiture, representations of rural life, agricultural hand tools, ploughs, farm machinery, sewing machines  and other equipment.

The museum has a specialist library and houses other collections including the library of the Tools & Trades History Society.

Gallery

References

External links 

Museums established in 1951
Alfred Waterhouse buildings
Rural history museums in England
Agricultural museums in England
Museums of the University of Reading
English coast and countryside
1951 establishments in England
Musical instrument museums